The Raleigh Burner is a BMX bicycle first launched in early 1982 by the Raleigh Bicycle Company. The name continued to 1988 and was brought back in the early 2000s, although it has been nowhere near as successful saleswise as the 1980s item.

Frames 

The Raleigh Burner range was split into six different frames:
 Mk1 Burner
 MK1 Pro Burner
 Mk2 Burner
 MK2 Aero Pro Burner
 Team Frame

Mk1 Burner 
This can be identified by the loop tail frame and gusset with two holes in it.
This first version (1982–1983) was originally available in three variants: 
The basic model was available with either a blue or red frame. It had conventional wire-spoked wheels, matt black front forks, yellow saddle and frame pads, and gold-coloured brake calipers and levers. Typical UK retail price of the basic model in 1982 was £120.

During this period, the next model up was the Tuff Burner. As per the basic model, the Tuff Burner was available with either red or blue frames, and accompanied by matt black forks, yellow saddle and frame pads, and gold-coloured brake levers and calipers, the Tuff Burner was distinguished from the basic model by its yellow, five-spoke 'Mag' (plastic) wheels. Typical UK retail price of the red or blue Tuff Burner in 1982 was £130.

The top-of-the-line model in the years 1982–1983 was the Super Burner, which was distinguished by its apparently gold paintwork (In fact, the bike's frame was chrome plated and then covered with a transparent, gold-tinted film). It had black frame pads with gold coloured script. In the years 1982–1983 the Mark 1 Super Burner was available only with conventional wire-spoked wheels that had gold-painted rims, although a variant with five-spoke mag wheels (in black) became available for the 1984 model year. This later 'Mag' version of the Super Burner was known as the Super Tuff Burner. The typical UK retail price of a Super Burner in 1982 was £140. Also available was an Ultra Burner, available in two colour combinations – silver and blue, and black and gold. In 2019, Raleigh re-released the Super Tuff Burner as a limited edition product, where it retailed at £600.

Mk1.2 Burner - AKA Model B 
These Burners still had round tubing but several key features changed, among them: plastic pedals replaced the original metal "rat-traps", rubber grips with two-tone coloring replaced the foam ones, and tubing was deemed Carbospec 23 with stickers in key locations such as the fork, replacing the regular Raleigh logo with "Competition 23" etc.

Mk2 Burner 
This has an oval profile rather than round as per Mk1.The looptail was ditched and the frame made longer. A letter 'R' was cut out in the front and rear wheel spindle drop outs.

There were also some Burners built using Japanese Tange or Kozumi frames. These were the Cromo Burner, the Aero Pro and the Team Aero Pro. These were top-class bikes with quality wheels and brakes.

MK3 Burner 
In 2007 Raleigh started to release anniversary models in limited numbers. Raleigh joined forces with Burner fans to re-create what was deemed the most memorable Burner (the Aero pro burner in the Raleigh team colours). Mag burners have followed since.

Burner
Bicycles